The 1980 New York City Marathon was the 11th edition of the New York City Marathon and took place in New York City on 26 October.

Results

Men

Women

References

Results. Association of Road Racing Statisticians. Retrieved 2020-04-24.

External links

New York City Marathon
New York Marathon
New York Marathon
Marathon